Shubhangi Latkar is an Indian actress who appears mainly in Hindi and Marathi films. She is known for her character roles in Delhi Belly (2011), Aashiqui 2 (2013), Singham Returns (2014) and Jolly LLB 2 (2017), The Fame Game (Netflix Web Series). She also appeared in various Indian television serials.

Filmography

Films

References

External links
 
 Shubhangi Latkar - Movies, Biography, News, Age & Photos

Living people
Indian actresses
Year of birth missing (living people)